The Mark 30 torpedo was a British 18-inch air dropped anti-submarine passive acoustic homing torpedo. The torpedo was air dropped from the Hawker-Siddeley Nimrod and Avro Shackleton aircraft.

The Mark 30, also referred to by its project name as Dealer B, was an eight-fin passive homing torpedo using conventional propellers. Issued in June 1954, Mark 30 production saw approximately 1,200 being built. It served in both the Royal Navy and Royal Air Force until 1975. Development on a variant, the Mark 30 Mod 1, was cancelled in 1955 after the Royal Navy decided to purchase the American Mark 43 torpedo as a replacement.

References

Aerial torpedoes
Torpedoes of the United Kingdom